Greenhouse debt is the measure to which an individual person, incorporated association, business enterprise, government instrumentality or / [and] (per Neb., USA) geographic community exceeds its permitted greenhouse footprint and emits greenhouse gases that contribute to global warming and climate change.

Friends of the Earth and similar organisations put forward the concept to define specifically the environmental harm caused by developed countries' past and present policies. Some governments, at least the Australian Labor leadership, have a tendency to accept such a line of reasoning. The concept, however, makes no sense without a clear numerical value for the permitted greenhouse footprint, which is not easily defined or estimated.

The greenhouse debt assessment thus forms an ecological footprint analysis, but can be used separately. Taken conjointly with a 'water debt' analysis and an ecological impact assessment, greenhouse debt analysis is basic to giving individuals, organisations, governments and communities an understanding of the effects they are having on Gaia, life, and global warming.

Ensuring that the greenhouse debt is zero is essential towards achieving ecologically sustainable development or a sustainable retreat. Any greenhouse debt incurred will contribute to making life harder for future generations of humans and non-human lifeforms.

There are three possible consequences that occur as a result of a greenhouse debt.

Mitigation: finding compensatory ways of reducing the greenhouse debt so its effects are neutralised
Adaptation: finding ways of adjusting to the resulting global warming or climate change
Suffering: having one's quality of life reduced as a result of the consequences

See also
Ecological debt
Ecological deficit
Ecological footprint

References

Climate change assessment and attribution
Greenhouse gas emissions
Sustainable development